Sarah Nemtsov (née Reuter, born 28 May 1980) is a German composer.
Nemtsov was born in Oldenburg and now lives in Berlin. She started her music lessons and composing aged eight. She started playing the oboe aged 14. Her compositions are recognizable through their confrontation with literature and other art forms. More recently, her compositions are a combination of the styles of classical and music theater.

She became a full-time composer in 2007. All of her works are published by Peermusic Classical GmbH. She is married to the pianist and musicologist Jascha Nemtsov.

Education
She studied composition under Nigel Osborne and Johannes Schöllhorn, and oboe under  at the Hochschule für Musik und Theater Hannover.  At the Universität der Künste Berlin, she continued her oboe studies under Burkhard Glaetzner, and her composition at post-graduate level with Walter Zimmermann, where she graduated with distinction.

Awards and scholarships
Nemtsov has won several awards as a composer, including the national competition for young composers, "Schueler kompomieren", fives times between 1995 and 1999, as well as the international Delmenhorst competition for composers in 1995. In 2007, Nemtsov won the Hanns-Eisler-Preis for Composition. In 2012, she was awarded the “Deutscher Musikautorenpreis” for the support of upcoming composers.

In addition, she has received several scholarships, including one from the German Academic Foundation in 2003, and one from the Aribert Reimann Foundation in 2007. In 2009 she received a scholarship from the Wilfried Steinbrenner Foundation, and in 2011, she was a fellow at Villa Serpentara (Italy). She has also received grants from the Berlin Senate and the Stiftung Zurückgeben.

Notable performances
Her music has been performed at many international festivals including Donaueschinger Musiktage, Bregenz Festival, Münchener Biennale, Holland Festival, Wien Modern and Festival Musica.

Selected works

Operas

Herzland

Chamber opera in five acts, 30'. Libretto after the correspondence between Paul Celan and Gisèle Celan-Lestrange. Premiered in on January 20, 2006, Alte Zeche, Barsinghausen, (original version);24 Nov 2009, Hubert-Burda-Saal, Munich (revised version)

L'Absence

Full-length opera in five acts with prologue and epilogue. Libretto by the composer, after Livre des Questions by Edmond Jabès. Premiere on May 3, 2012 by Munich Biennale.

Sacrifice

Opera in four acts written in 2016. Premiered on March 5, 2017 by Oper Halle. Libretto by Dirk Laucke (excerpts from “Trenches of Joy”).

Orchestral works

Scattered ways

Work for large orchestra written in 2015. Duration of 10 minutes. World premiere by Philharmonisches Orchester Erfurt.

SHESH

A work for amplified string orchestra written in 2014. Duration of 18 minutes. World premiere was by Orchester Jakobsplatz.

Other

Room I-III

"Layering for 8 musicians" written in 2013. Duration of 18 minutes.

References

External links

German opera composers
21st-century classical composers
German women classical composers
1980 births
People from Oldenburg (city)
Living people
Hochschule für Musik, Theater und Medien Hannover alumni
Women opera composers
21st-century German composers
Women classical composers
21st-century women composers
21st-century German women